Géraldine Beigbeder is a Paris-based novelist, screen writer, visual artist and designer. She is also the European curator of British rock musician Pete Doherty's paintings.

Beigbeder's best known novels are Sponsors (Editions Ramsay, 2007) and Larguée en périphérie de la zone politique et autres petits désordres organiques (Albin Michel, 2011).

She has written screenplays with Jean-Luc Azoulay and created sitcoms for TF1, France 2 and M6.

References

Living people
21st-century French novelists
21st-century French women writers
French women screenwriters
French women novelists
Writers from Paris
Year of birth missing (living people)
Place of birth missing (living people)
21st-century French screenwriters